Yury Doroshkevich (born 30 June 1978) is a Belarusian professional football coach and former player. As of 2013, he works as a youth coach at BATE Borisov.

Honours
BATE Borisov
Belarusian Premier League champion: 1999

References

External links
 
 Profile at BATE website
 Profile at teams.by

1978 births
Living people
Belarusian footballers
Belarus international footballers
FC BATE Borisov players
FC Smorgon players
FC Torpedo-BelAZ Zhodino players
FC Belshina Bobruisk players
FC Ataka Minsk players
FC Luninets players
Association football midfielders